Chris Udofia (born July 18, 1992) is an American professional basketball player who last played for the Santa Cruz Warriors of the NBA Development League. He played college basketball for the University of Denver.

High school career
Udofia attended Jesuit Dallas High School where he led them to a 0-8173713 record and District 8-5A championship as a senior earning several awards, among them, the First Team All-Region as a senior and First Team All-District as both a junior and senior.

College career
Udofia attended the University of Denver where he averaged 12.1 points, 4.9 rebounds, 2.8 assists, 2.06 blocks, 1.14 steals and 29.5 minutes in 124 games, finishing his career first in program history in blocked shots (256) and games played (124); fifth in points (1,501) and field goals made (551); seventh in assists (349), steals (141) and free throws made (334). He also was a three-time first-team all-conference selection in three different leagues.

Professional career
After going undrafted in the 2014 NBA draft, Udofia joined the Houston Rockets for the 2014 NBA Summer League. On August 23, 2014, Udofia signed with Elitzur Yavne of the Israeli Liga Leumit where he averaged 10.8 points, 8.8 rebounds and 1.68 blocks in 27.8 minutes after playing in 28 games.

On October 19, 2015, Udofia signed with the Golden State Warriors. However, he was waived just four days later. On November 2, he was acquired by the Santa Cruz Warriors of the NBA Development League as an affiliate player of Golden State.

Personal life
Udofia is the son of Theresa and Don Udofia. His father died in 2015 from cancer. He has two brothers, Don and Joseph and majored on Integrated Sciences with a focus in Biology with a minor in Psychology.

References

External links
 Denver bio
 RealGM profile
 USBasket profile
 Sports-Reference profile

1992 births
Living people
American expatriate basketball people in Israel
Basketball players from Texas
Denver Pioneers men's basketball players
Elitzur Yavne B.C. players
People from Irving, Texas
Santa Cruz Warriors players
Small forwards
American men's basketball players
Jesuit College Preparatory School of Dallas alumni